Upper Weyanoke is a historic plantation house close to Charles City, Charles City County, Virginia. The property contains a one-and-a-half-story cottage built in about 1815, and a larger two-story Greek Revival style residence erected in 1858–59.   The cottage was probably built by John Minge as a two-room dependency to a now-vanished main dwelling. The main house was built for Robert Douthat, and is a two-story brick dwelling with a side-hall plan typically utilized in urban homes, rather than rural plantation houses.

The house was added to the National Register of Historic Places in 1980.

References 

James River plantations
Houses on the National Register of Historic Places in Virginia
Houses completed in 1859
Houses in Charles City County, Virginia
National Register of Historic Places in Charles City County, Virginia
Plantation houses in Virginia